Obong University is a four-year private university located in Obong Ntak, Akwa Ibom State, Nigeria.  It is associated with the Churches of Christ, and its sponsoring congregation is the Rivergate Church of Christ in Madison, Tennessee.

Founded in 1997 as African College of Management, the following year gave rise to the University of Africa, as Obong University was formerly known.  The university is in close fellowship with Obong Christian School (founded 1986), which is sponsored by the congregation of Christians at Mt. Morris, Michigan.  The Christian school, also in Obong Ntak, has educated thousands of young people across Nigeria and surrounding countries.

The schools are under the direction of Dr. Moses Akpanudo, who, with the help of his Nigerian countrymen and American friends, worked to gain university status for Obong.  This elevation was achieved on May 2, 2007.

The University houses a Faculty of Natural and Applied Sciences with degrees available in Computer Science, Microbiology, and Biochemistry. In the Faculty of Arts and Humanities, the University offers degree programmes in English Studies and Religious Studies. It also houses a Faculty of Management and Social Sciences, with degrees in Economics, Accounting, Business Administration, Mass Communication, Marketing, Sociology, Peace Studies and Conflict Resolution, Public Administration, International Relations and Political Science.

In addition to the grade school, there is a more recently completed hospital facility on the university's campus.

Resources

School Library:  Available
Scholarship: No
Sport Facilities: Yes
Housing: Yes
School Fees: Yes

References

External links
  Obong University Official Website

Universities and colleges affiliated with the Churches of Christ
Educational institutions established in 1997
Christian universities and colleges in Nigeria
Education in Akwa Ibom State
1997 establishments in Nigeria